The New Zealand A cricket team is a cricket team representing New Zealand, and is the second tier of international New Zealand cricket below the full New Zealand cricket team. The team played its first game, against an England XI, in 1996/97.

New Zealand A have played fewer games in their history than most other A sides, partly because of a three-year gap between 2000/01 and 2003/04 in which they played no matches at all.

Season-by-season results summary

First-class matches

References

National 'A' cricket teams
Cricket teams in New Zealand
Cricket, A